Maëlle Ourida Louisette Lakrar (born 27 May 2000) is a French professional footballer who plays as a defender for Division 1 Féminine club Montpellier and the France national team.

Club career
A former youth academy player of Salon BAF, Lakrar joined Division 2 Féminine club Marseille in August 2015 at the age of fifteen. In July 2018, she moved to Montpellier.

International career
Lakrar is a former French youth international and was part of France under-19 squad which won the 2019 UEFA Championship.

In February 2023, Lakrar received her first call-up to the senior team for the 2023 Tournoi de France. She made her debut on 18 February 2023 in a 5–1 win against Uruguay.

Career statistics

Club

International

Honours
Marseille
 Division 2 Féminine: 2015–16

France U19
 UEFA Women's Under-19 Championship: 2019

Individual
 UEFA Women's Under-19 Championship Team of the Tournament: 2019

References

External links
 
 

2000 births
Living people
Women's association football defenders
French women's footballers
France women's youth international footballers
France women's international footballers
Division 1 Féminine players
Division 2 Féminine players
Olympique de Marseille (women) players
Montpellier HSC (women) players
People from Orange, Vaucluse